This list contains annual awards given to the top national high school basketball player in the United States.

Gatorade National Basketball Player of the Year
MaxPreps National Basketball Player of the Year
Mr. Basketball USA
Morgan Wootten National Player of the Year
Naismith Prep Player of the Year Award
Parade High School Basketball Player of the Year
USA Today High School Basketball Player of the Year

High school basketball national player of the year awards
National player of the year awards